The term Eastern Protestant Christianity (or Eastern Reformed Christianity as well as Oriental Protestant Christianity) encompasses a range of heterogeneous Protestant Christian denominations that developed outside of the Occident, from the latter half of the nineteenth century, and yet keep elements of Eastern Christianity, to varying degrees. Some of these denominations came into being, when existing Protestant churches adopted reformational variants of Eastern and Oriental Orthodox liturgy and worship. Some others are the result of reformations of Orthodox beliefs and practices, inspired by the teachings of Western Protestant missionaries. Some Eastern Protestant Churches are in communion with similar Western Protestant Churches. However, Eastern Protestant Christianity does not constitute a single communion. This is due to the diverse polities, practices, liturgies and orientations of the denominations which fall under this category.

Major branches

Anglican

Mar Thoma Syrian Church 

The Mar Thoma church has its origins in a reformation movement in the Malankara Church, in the latter half of the nineteenth century. India was part of the British Empire at the time and the Malankara Church with its Oriental Orthodox traditions, in communion with the Syriac Orthodox Patriarchate of Antioch. Concurrently, Anglican missionaries from England arrived in South India, on a help mission for the Malankara Church. They became teachers at the Church's seminary and made the Bible available in Malayalam. Inspired by the teachings of the missionaries and imbibing the ideas of the Protestant Reformation from them, a few priests under the leadership of Abraham Malpan initiated a reformation based on the Bible. Abraham Malpan also managed to get his nephew Deacon Mathew, ordained as bishop Mathews Mar Athanasius, by the Patriarch of Antioch. But many opposed the reforms. The groups for and against reforms engaged in court litigations for the Church and its properties. These ended in 1889, through a verdict favoring the Patriarchal faction. Subsequently, the reformed faction became an independent church. To date, there are 11 bishops, 1149 priests and over a million laity.  While retaining many of the Syriac high church practices, the Mar Thoma Church is Reformed in its theology and doctrines. It employs a reformed variant of the Liturgy of Saint James, with many parts in the local vernacular. The Mar Thoma church is in full communion with the Anglican Communion and maintains friendly relations with many other churches.

Society for Eastern Rite Anglicanism 
The Society for Eastern Rite Anglicanism (SERA) is an organization working to promote and sustain a movement towards an established Eastern Rite in the Anglican Communion. Established in 2013, it formulated an Anglo-Orthodox Divine Liturgy. It is based on the Divine Liturgy of Saint John Chrysostom and is used by the society.

Lutheran 

Eastern Lutheranism refers to Lutheran churches, such as those of Ukraine and Slovenia, that use a form of the Byzantine Rite as their liturgy. It is unique in that it is based on the Eastern Christian rite used by the Eastern Orthodox Church, while incorporating theology from the Divine Service contained in the Formula Missae, the base texts for Lutheran liturgies in the West.

Laestadianism 

In the far north of the Scandinavian peninsula are the Sámi people, some of which practice a form of Lutheranism called Apostolic Lutheranism, or Laestadianism due to the efforts of Lars Levi Laestadius. However, others are Orthodox in religion. Some Apostolic Lutherans consider their movement as part of an unbroken line down from the Apostles. In Russia, Laestadians of Lutheran background cooperate with the Ingrian church, but since Laestadianism is an interdenominational movement, some are Eastern Orthodox. Eastern Orthodox Laestadians are known as Ushkovayzet (article is in Russian).

Ukrainian Lutheran Church 

The Ukrainian Lutheran Church, formerly called the Ukrainian Evangelical Church of the Augsburg Confession, is a Byzantine Rite Lutheran Church based in Ukraine. The Eastern Christian denomination consists of 25 congregations within Ukraine, serving over 2,500 members and runs Saint Sophia Ukrainian Lutheran Theological Seminary in Ternopil in Western Ukraine. The ULC is a member of the Confessional Evangelical Lutheran Conference (CELC), a worldwide organization of confessional Lutheran church bodies of the same beliefs.

Reformed/Presbyterian

Assyrian Evangelical Church 

The Assyrian Evangelical Church is a Middle Eastern Church which attained ecclesiastical independence from the Presbyterian mission in Iran, in 1870. Its membership comprise mostly of Eastern Aramaic speaking ethnic Assyrians who were originally part of the Assyrian Church of the East and its offshoots or the Syriac Orthodox Church. They, like other Assyrian Christians are sometimes targets of persecution by hostile governments and neighbors.

Armenian Evangelical Church 

The Armenian Evangelical Church is the product of a reform campaign from within the Armenian Apostolic Church. The reformers were influenced by the missionaries of the American Board of Commissioners for Foreign Missions, who arrived in Turkey in the early nineteenth century, and published translated bibles for the Turkish-speaking Armenians.

The reformers were led by Krikor Peshdimaljian, one of the leading intellectuals of the time. Peshdimaljian was the head of a training school for the Armenian Apostolic clergy. The school was under the auspices of the Armenian Patriarchate of Constantinople. Out of this school, emerged a society called the Pietisical Union, whose members focused more directly on the Bible and organized Bible study meetings. They began to raise questions about the conflicts between biblical truths and the traditional practices of the Armenian Apostolic Church. The Union also advocated Pietism, which they believed their church was devoid of.

The leadership of the Armenian Apostolic Church under Patriarch Matteos Chouhajian was against any reform, and excommunicated the reformists from the church. This separation led to the formation of the Armenian Evangelical Church, on July 1, 1846, at Constantinople. By 1850, the new church received the official recognition of the Ottoman government. Later, however, Armenians were forced out of Ottoman Turkey, due to the Armenian genocide. The Armenian Evangelical congregations in the Middle East are currently organized as the Union of the Armenian Evangelical Churches in the Near East.

Evangelical

St. Thomas Evangelical Church of India 

The St. Thomas Evangelical Church of India (STECI) is an Evangelical, Episcopal denomination based in Kerala, India. It derives from a schism in the Malankara Mar Thoma Syrian Church in 1961. STECI holds that the Bible is the inspired, inerrant and infallible Word of God. Adherents believe that all that is necessary for salvation and living in righteousness is given in the Bible. The church is engaged in active evangelism. The headquarters of this church is at Tiruvalla, a town in the state of Kerala.

Assyrian Pentecostal Church 

The Assyrian Pentecostal Church is a pentecostal Christian denomination which originated in the 1940s among the Assyrian people of Iran and spread among ethnic Assyrians in Iraq, Turkey and Syria. They are native speakers of the Assyrian Neo-Aramaic language and use it as their liturgical language too. They also use the Syriac Aramaic Bible. Most of its members were originally part of the Assyrian Church of the East and its offshoots or the Syriac Orthodox Church. This denomination is affiliated to the Assemblies of God Church. There has been reported instances of persecution against them as well.

Believers Eastern Church 

Believers Eastern Church (formerly Believers Church) is a Christian denomination with roots in Pentecostalism, based in Kerala, India. It exists as a part of the Gospel for Asia. In 2003, this church acquired episcopacy, by getting Indian Anglican bishops ordain its founder K. P. Yohannan, as a bishop. Henceforth this denomination adopted several elements of Eastern Christian worship and practices like usage of anointed holy oils, yet keeping the principle of sola scriptura. Its name was officially changed to Believers Eastern Church in 2017, so as to "better express its roots in the ancient and orthodox faith".

Evangelical Church of Romania 

The Evangelical Church of Romania (Romanian: Biserica Evanghelică Română) is one of Romania's eighteen officially recognised religious denominations. The church originated between 1920 and 1924, through work of the young Romanian Orthodox theologians Dumitru Cornilescu and Tudor Popescu. 

Deacon Cornilescu was motivated to translate the Bible into modern Romanian, by Princess Calimachi of Moldavia. While translating the Epistle to the Romans, Cornilescu became interested in the concept of personal salvation. By the time he completed the translation, he had become staunchly evangelical. Afterwards, Cornilescu served as a deacon under Fr. Tudor Popescu, at the Cuibul cu barză Church in Bucharest. After some time, Popescu converted to evangelicalism, due to Cornilescu's influence. Both of them began to preach salvation by personal faith in Christ. Gradually, they gained a significant following, including priests from the Romanian Orthodox Church. Soon other evangelical traits, such as singing and congregational participation, began to manifest in this group. They called into question many Orthodox practices, which they perceived to be unbiblical. Tudor Popescu has been called the Romanian Martin Luther, for his attempts to reform the Romanian Orthodox Church.

Due to deviations from Eastern Orthodox doctrines, the Romanian Orthodox Church defrocked Fr. Tudor Popescu. Dumitru Cornilescu was forced to leave the country. But Popescu and his followers (originally called Tudorists), established their own Church; the Evangelical Church of Romania.

Evangelical Orthodox Church 

The Evangelical Orthodox Church is a Christian denomination which blends Evangelical Protestantism with features of Eastern Orthodoxy. It started off in 1973 as a network of house churches established by Campus Crusade for Christ missionaries in the United States. The founders Peter E. Gillquist, Jack Sparks, Jon Braun, and J.R. Ballew wanted to restore Christianity to its primitive form based on the writings of the early Church Fathers. So they stood in a circle and self-ordained each other, creating an entity called the New Covenant Apostolic Order (NCAO). Their own interpretations of Church history led to the adoption of a somewhat liturgical form of worship and induced a need for apostolic succession.  In 1977 the first contact with the Eastern Orthodox Church was initiated through Orthodox seminarian Fr. John Bartke. In 1979 the Evangelical Orthodox Church (EOC) was organized. The EOC pursued various avenues to obtain episcopacy, including a visit to the Patriarch of Constantinople, but to no avail. At last they met Patriarch Ignatius IV of Antioch, during his historic visit to Los Angeles, which proved successful. This meeting was arranged by Fr. John Bartke, who later served as the primary intermediary between the EOC and the Antiochian Orthodox Archdiocese, and also hosted the initial set of chrismations and ordinations for the EOC at St. Michael's Church in Van Nuys, California. Unable to completely reconcile Evangelicalism and Orthodoxy, many EOC members formally joined the Antiochian Orthodox Christian Archdiocese of North America in 1987. Some others joined the Orthodox Church in America. The rest remained independent and continue as the Evangelical Orthodox Church.

P'ent'ay 

The P'ent'ay is an Amharic and Tigrinya language term for evangelical Christians in Ethiopia and Eritrea. This movement have been influenced by the mainstream Orthodox Christianity of these countries as well as Pentecostalism. As Protestantism is relatively new in Ethiopia, most P'ent'ay are ex-Orthodox Christians. Many of these groups describe their religious practices as culturally Orthodox, but Protestant by doctrine. They boast approximately 16,500,000 members.  The P'ent'ay denominations may constitute as much as 19% of the population of Ethiopia, while being a small minority in Eritrea.

List of churches

See also
 Army of the Lord, an evangelical movement within the Romanian Orthodox Church
 Zoë movement, sometimes regarded as a crypto-Protestant movement in the Greek church.
 Spiritual Christianity, refers to Russian "folk Protestants", non-Orthodox indigenous to then the Russian Empire that emerged from among the Orthodox, and from the Bezpopovtsy Raskolniks.

References

Eastern Christianity
Protestantism
Protestant denominations established in the 19th century
Protestant denominational families